Romeo Roy Blanchette (January 6, 1913 – January 10, 1982) was an American prelate of the Roman Catholic Church. He served as bishop of the Diocese of Joliet in Illinois from 1966 to 1979.

Biography

Early life 
Romeo Blanchette was born on January 6, 1913, in Kankakee County, Illinois, to Oscar and Josephine (née Langlois) Blanchette. After attending Archbishop Quigley Preparatory Seminary in Chicago from 1928 to 1931, he studied at St. Mary of the Lake Seminary in Mundelein, Illinois, receiving a Bachelor of Arts degree in 1934.

Priesthood 
Blanchette was ordained to the priesthood for the Archdiocese of Chicago by Cardinal George Mundelein on April 3, 1937, upon the recommendation of rector Reynold Henry Hillenbrand. He continued his studies in Rome at the Pontifical Gregorian University, earning a Licentiate of Canon Law in 1939. Blanchette served as a notary of the matrimonial court for the archdiocese. (1938-1949).  When the Diocese of Joliet was erected in 1949, Bishop Martin McNamara made him chancellor there. In 1950, Blanchette was named vicar general of the diocese and a domestic prelate.

Auxiliary Bishop and Bishop of Joliet 
On February 8, 1965, Blanchette was appointed as an auxiliary bishop of the Diocese of Joliet and titular bishop of Maxita by Pope Paul VI. He received his episcopal consecration on April 3, 1965, from Archbishop Egidio Vagnozzi, with Bishops William Aloysius O'Connor and Ernest John Primeau serving as co-consecrators. Blanchette attended the fourth session of the Second Vatican Council.

Following the death of Bishop McNamara, Blanchette was named by Pope Paul as the second bishop of Joliet on July 19, 1966.

Retirement and legacy 
On January 30, 1979, Pope John Paul II accepted Blanchette's resignation as Bishop of Joliet after he was diagnosed with Lou Gehrig's disease. Romeo Blanchette died of that disease at St. Joseph's Hospital in Joliet on January 10, 1982, at age 69.

In a 2015 lawsuit brought against the diocese by sexual abuse victims, it was revealed that Blanchette ignored warnings about the behavior of certain seminarians. The diocese settled with the victims for over $4 million.

 He allowed the ordination of Lawrence Gibbs in 1973, despite complaints about his behavior from administrators at Saint Mary of the Lake Seminary.  Gibbs eventually molested 14 boys. 
 Blanchette allowed James Nowak to be ordained, despite knowing that the Capuchin Order had dismissed him due to his failure to keep his vow of chastity.  Nowak eventually abused eight children.

References

1913 births
1982 deaths
People from Kankakee County, Illinois
Roman Catholic bishops of Joliet in Illinois
20th-century Roman Catholic bishops in the United States
Participants in the Second Vatican Council
University of Saint Mary of the Lake alumni
Neurological disease deaths in Illinois
Deaths from motor neuron disease